Steuer is a German surname that may refer to
Anni Steuer (1913–1990s), German hurdler
Christin Steuer (born 1983), German diver
Egon Steuer (born 1935), Czech basketball player
Feliks Steuer (1889–1950), Silesian educationist
Heiko Steuer (born 1939), German archaeologist
Ingo Steuer (born 1966), German pair skater and skating coach
Jon Paul Steuer (1984–2018), American actor
Jonathan Steuer (born 1965), American online publisher
Lowie Steuer (born 1995), Belgian volleyball player 
Max Steuer (1870–1940), American trial attorney 
Noemi Steuer (1957–2020) Swiss-born actress 
Aron Steuer (1898–1985), American lawyer and judge

See also
Rivalen am Steuer, an East German film released in 1957

German-language surnames